The Texas Legends Junior Tour was established in 2004 under the umbrella of the Texas Golf Association Foundation, a 501 (c) (3) organization.

Membership 
Membership with the Legends Junior Tour is available through the Texas Junior Golf Alliance. Membership is a requirement to participate in the championships conducted by the Tour. Eligibility will be open to young men and women, ages 18 & under whom meet the eligibility requirements and have distinguished themselves in local, regional, statewide and national competitions.

Membership is divided into four divisions: Boys 14 & Under, Boys 15-18 and Girls 15-18.

Tournaments 
The Legends Junior Tour is home to such events as the Byron Nelson Junior Championship, Texas Junior Amateur, Texas Cup Invitational, Texas Girls' Invitational and Jackie Burke Cup Matches.

External links
 Official site

Junior golf
Golf associations
Golf in Texas